Tegg is a surname. Notable people with the surname include:

 Rebecca Tegg (born 1985), New Zealand footballer
 Susan Tegg (born 1975), Australian canoeist
 Thomas Tegg (1776–1845), British bookseller and publisher
 William Tegg (1816–1895), English publisher

See also
 Pegg